IFK Östersund is a Swedish football club located in Östersund in Jämtland.

Background
Idrottsföreningen Kamraterna Östersund were founded on 7 March 1906 at the Café Temperance in Östersund.  The club subsequently joined the IFK movement and specialised in a range of sports including football, bandy, ice hockey, handball, downhill skiing, cross country skiing, ski jumping, cycling, athletics, basketball, curling, boxing, wrestling, weightlifting and orienteering.

Since their foundation IFK Östersund has participated mainly in the upper and middle divisions of the Swedish football league system.  The club's best period was in the 1950s and 1960s when they played a number of seasons in Division 2 Norrland which at that time was the second tier of Swedish football. In May 1959 the club hosted touring Brazilian side CR Vasco de Gama and lost 11–0.

The club currently plays in Division 3 Mellersta Norrland which is the fifth tier of Swedish football. They play their home matches at the Hofvallens IP in Östersund. The ground was first opened in 1917 but its current appearance reflects the work undertaken in 1936 when Hofvallen was redeveloped.

IFK Östersund are affiliated to the Jämtland-Härjedalens Fotbollförbund. In 1996/1997 the Ope IF, IFK Östersund, Ostersund / Torvalla FF clubs decided to work together on a joint venture to establish an elite new football club named Östersunds FK.

Players

First team squad

Season to season

Attendances

In recent seasons IFK Östersund have had the following average attendances:

The highest attendance at Hofvallen was 5,355 spectators who attended the match with Marma IF (in Division 2 Norrland) on 5 October 1957.

Footnotes

External links
 IFK Östersund – Official website
 IFK Östersund Facebook

Ifk Ostersund
Football clubs in Jämtland County
Association football clubs established in 1906
Bandy clubs established in 1906
Ice hockey clubs established in 1906
1906 establishments in Sweden
Idrottsföreningen Kamraterna